Krzysztof Skorupski (born 25 April 1989) is a professional rallycross driver from Warsaw in Poland. He raced in the opening four rounds of the World Rallycross championship with Monster Energy World RX following victory in the Polish Super1600 category.

Results

Complete FIA World Rallycross Championship results

Supercar

References

Living people
1989 births
Polish racing drivers
European Rallycross Championship drivers
World Rallycross Championship drivers
Sportspeople from Warsaw